Wang Chi-lin (born 18 January 1995) is a Taiwanese badminton player who specializes in doubles. He is the 2020 Olympics men's doubles champion.

Career 
In 2021, at the 2020 Tokyo Olympics, he and his partner Lee Yang defeated the 2018 World Champions' Li Junhui and Liu Yuchen in the men's doubles final. They became the first unseeded pair to win a gold medal in the Olympics' men's doubles badminton. This was Chinese Taipei's first Olympic medal in badminton. In 2022, Wang and Lee were named two of Taiwan's Ten Outstanding Young Persons by the Junior Chamber International Taiwan.

Achievements

Olympic Games 
Men's doubles

BWF World Championships 
Men's doubles

Summer Universiade 
Mixed doubles

World University Championships 
Men's doubles

BWF World Junior Championships 
Boys' doubles

Asian Junior Championships 
Boys' doubles

BWF World Tour (10 titles, 7 runners-up) 
The BWF World Tour, which was announced on 19 March 2017 and implemented in 2018, is a series of elite badminton tournaments sanctioned by the Badminton World Federation (BWF). The BWF World Tour is divided into levels of World Tour Finals, Super 1000, Super 750, Super 500, Super 300, and the BWF Tour Super 100.

Men's doubles

Mixed doubles

BWF Grand Prix (3 titles, 4 runners-up) 
The BWF Grand Prix had two levels, the Grand Prix and Grand Prix Gold. It was a series of badminton tournaments sanctioned by the Badminton World Federation (BWF) and played between 2007 and 2017.

Men's doubles

Mixed doubles

  BWF Grand Prix Gold tournament
  BWF Grand Prix tournament

BWF International Challenge/Series (4 titles, 4 runners-up) 
Men's doubles

Mixed doubles

  BWF International Challenge tournament
  BWF International Series tournament
  BWF Future Series tournament

References

External links 

 

1995 births
Living people
Sportspeople from Taipei
Taiwanese male badminton players
Badminton players at the 2020 Summer Olympics
Olympic badminton players of Taiwan
Olympic gold medalists for Taiwan
Olympic medalists in badminton
Medalists at the 2020 Summer Olympics
Badminton players at the 2018 Asian Games
Asian Games bronze medalists for Chinese Taipei
Asian Games medalists in badminton
Medalists at the 2018 Asian Games
Universiade gold medalists for Chinese Taipei
Universiade medalists in badminton
Medalists at the 2017 Summer Universiade